Standing Tall may refer to:

Standing Tall (The Crusaders album), 1980
Standing Tall (Kym Marsh album), 2003
Standing Tall, a 2015 French film
"Standing Tall", a 1980 single by Billie Jo Spears, also covered by Lorrie Morgan
Standing Tall (Billie Jo Spears album), 1980
Standing Tall (Io ti cercherò), a 2020 Italian TV series starring Alessandro Gassmann

See also
Walking Tall (disambiguation)